Statistics of Copenhagen Football Championship in the 1905/1906 season.

Overview
It was contested by 5 teams, and Boldklubben af 1893 won the championship.

League standings

References
Denmark - List of final tables (RSSSF)

1905–06 in Danish football
Top level Danish football league seasons
Copenhagen Football Championship seasons
Denmark